The mathematician Leonhard Euler (1707–1783) made several different conjectures which are all called Euler's conjecture:

Euler's sum of powers conjecture
Euler's conjecture (Waring's problem)
Euler's Graeco-Latin square conjecture

Mathematics disambiguation pages